Jaramillo  is a corregimiento in Boquete District, Chiriquí Province, Panama. It was created by Law 58 of July 29, 1998, owing to the Declaration of Unconstitutionality of Law 1 of 1982. Its population as of 2000 was 2,047.

References

Corregimientos of Chiriquí Province